The Wisconsin Department of Natural Resources (WDNR) is a government agency of the U.S. state of Wisconsin charged with conserving and managing Wisconsin's natural resources.  The Wisconsin Natural Resources Board has the authority to set policy for the WDNR. The WDNR is led by the Secretary, who is appointed by the Governor of Wisconsin. The WDNR develops regulations and guidance in accordance with laws passed by the Wisconsin Legislature. It administers wildlife, fish, forests, endangered resources, air, water, waste, and other issues related to natural resources. The central office of the WDNR is located in downtown Madison, near the state capitol.

Mission 
The mission of the WDNR is "To protect and enhance our natural resources: our air, land and water; our wildlife, fish and forests and the ecosystems that sustain all life. To provide a healthy, sustainable environment and a full range of outdoor opportunities. To ensure the right of all people to use and enjoy these resources in their work and leisure. To work with people to understand each other’s views and to carry out the public will. And in this partnership consider the future and generations to follow."

History
The WDNR was created through the 1967 merger of two Wisconsin state agencies: The Conservation Department and The Department of Resource Development. This merger was designed to reduce the number of agencies and streamline operations. The governor at the time was Warren P. Knowles.

In 2021 a major illegal sturgeon egg harvesting and selling ring run in part by the former top sturgeon biologist for the Wisconsin Department of Natural Resources (DNR) was discovered and broken up by investigators.

Funding 
The WDNR is funded through the state budget, which is set by the Wisconsin Legislature. The WDNR presents a biennial budget to the Wisconsin Natural Resources Board for their review and approval. This budget reflects potential changes in the number of Full-Time Equivalent employees (FTE), as well as the overall operating budget the WDNR anticipates needing. The 2017-2019 budget, enacted by the Wisconsin Legislature, decreased the WDNR budget approximately 2.5% in relation to the 2016-2017 base year. The budget allows for $1.1 billion in funding for the WDNR over this two-year period. The 2017-2019 biennial budget also includes a decrease of 49.5 FTE, bringing department staffing to 2,499.6 FTE employees. Staffing for the WDNR decreased by 15% between 2000-2001 and 2017-2019, under both Democratic and Republican administrations.

The WDNR is currently led by the Secretary, Adam N. Payne, who was appointed to the post by governor Tony Evers in 2023.

Organization

Wisconsin Natural Resources Board 
The Wisconsin Natural Resources Board is the governing body of the WDNR. This board is filled by the Governor, who appoints seven individual members to serve without compensation. The appointments made by the Governor are confirmed by the state senate, and each board member serves a six-year staggered term. The role of the board members is to supervise the actions of the WDNR, make policy, and review the biennial budget.

Leadership
The senior leadership of the Department consists of the Secretary, Deputy Secretary, and Assistant Deputy Secretary, along with the administrators heading up the divisions of the Department.  Regional directors represent the department leadership around the state.
 Secretary: Adam N. Payne
 Deputy Secretary: Todd Ambs
 Assistant Deputy Secretary: Steven Little
 South regional director: Mark Aquino (Fitchburg)
 Southeast regional director: John Budninski (Milwaukee)
 West regional director: Dan Baumann (Eau Claire)
 North regional director: James Yach (Rhinelander)
 Northeast regional director: Jean Romback-Bartels (Green Bay)
 Environmental Management: Darsi Foss 
 External Services: Dave Siebert 
 Fish, Wildlife, and Parks: Keith Warnke 
 Forestry: Heather Berklund 
 Internal Services: Tim Cooke 
 Law Enforcement: Casey Krueger

Divisions

Environmental Management Division
"The Environmental Management (EM) Division protects human health and the environment by working in partnership with the communities, citizens, businesses and advocacy groups."  This division uses information about the environment such as the air and water to create a more conservation based protection over the different resources. The division is continually working to improve the information obtained through feedback and self-evaluation of different projects or policies implemented. The division administers and enforces several federal environmental laws including the Clean Air Act, Clean Water Act, Resource Conservation and Recovery Act, and Safe Drinking Water Act.
This division consists of six programs:
Air Management
Drinking Water & Groundwater
Office of Great Waters
Remediation & Redevelopment
Waste & Materials Management
Water Quality

External Services Division
The External Services Division was created though the Department of Natural Resources 2016 and 2017 alignment initiative. This division consists of:  Watershed Management, Environmental Analysis & Sustainability, Customer & Outreach Services, and Community Financial Assistance. "The purpose of this diverse program is to serve as a primary point of contact for businesses, local government and the public." Through this division, a well-rounded integration of the local government and public are reached. In collaboration with other divisions and other agencies, the WDNR is able to apply more parameters when it comes to making a decision about a project or other initiatives.

The Green Tier Program, a voluntary program set up by the Wisconsin Department of Natural Resources, provides state businesses with the opportunity to bring economics and the environment together.
As of March 2018, 73 corporations and companies are Green Tier participants, including 3M, ABB Inc., Frito-Lay, and Roundy's Supermarkets, Inc.
Green Tier includes multiple new charters which includes Legacy Communities - a Smart Growth partnership with an aim to assist communities to develop sustainability strategies at the local level.

Fish, Wildlife, & Parks Division
“The Fish, Wildlife, and Parks Division plans and directs activities to protect, manage, conserve, and wisely use Wisconsin’s lands, plants, wildlife, fisheries and recreation resources”. Though monitoring and establishing objectives about the wildlife populations, the division is able to gain a better understanding of the population numbers in an area to help make management decisions about a species. Along with a better understanding of wildlife populations, this division is able to preserve and protect future generations of species. These objectives and monitoring will also allow more statewide recreational and conservation activities. 
Programs within this division are:
Parks and Recreation Management
Wildlife Management
Natural Heritage Conservation
Fisheries Management
Office of Applied Science
Office of Business Services.
Directory of State Parks, Forests, & Natural Areas
Wisconsin is home to:
50 State Parks
9 State Forests
9 State Recreation Areas
44 State Trails
687 Natural Areas

Forestry Division
"The Forestry Division protects and sustains forested lands throughout the state, combining technical and financial assistance, planning, research, education and policy to sustain the forest for today and in the future." It covers 17.1 million acres of forest. The forest provides a lot of ecological services that are very beneficial such as timber products, nutrient cycling, habitat for wildlife, clean air, etc. Preserving the forest is therefore a crucial objective that has the potential to enhance our environment. Many outdoor activities such as hunting and fishing can be benefited through the maintenance and preservation of our state's forests. 
This division consists of eight programs: 
Forest Health
Forest Products Services
Forest Protection
Prescribed Fire
Privately Owned Forest Lands
Public Lands
Reforestation
Urban Forests

Internal Services Division
"The Internal Services Division serves internal and external customers of the department, which is responsible for Facility and Property Services, Human Resources, Fleet Management, Budget and Finance and Information Technology."

Bureau of Law Enforcement
The Wisconsin Conservation Warden Service is tasked with handling law enforcement duties for the WDNR. Seven Wisconsin Conservation Wardens have died in the line of duty since 1928.

Statutory councils
 Dry Cleaner Environmental Response Council
 Council on Forestry
 Metallic Mining Council
 Natural Areas Preservation Council  
 Nonmotorized Recreation and Transportation Trails Council 
 Off-Highway Motorcycle Council 
 Off-Road Vehicle Council 
 Small Business Environmental Council
 Snowmobile Recreational Council
 Sporting Heritage Council  
 State Trails Council
 Wetland Study Council

Statutorily-required advisory entities
 Fire Department Advisory Council 
 Urban Forestry Council

Attached independent entities
 Groundwater Coordinating Council 
 Invasive Species Council  
 Lake Michigan Commercial Fishing Board
 Lake Superior Commercial Fishing Board 
 Lower Wisconsin State Riverway Board 
 Council on Recycling 
 Wisconsin Waterways Commission

Affiliated entities
 The Wisconsin Conservation Congress (WCC) advises the WDNR and Natural Resources Board on managing the state's natural resources. The WCC is composed of citizen-elected delegates including five members of an executive committee, 22 members of a district leadership council, 360 county delegates (five per county), and the general public. The WCC was created in 1934. The WCC provides citizens an opportunity to give input and discuss conservation issues.

Volunteer opportunities
The WDNR provides volunteer opportunities for those interested in natural resources, including Adopt a Fish and Wildlife Area, Wisconsin State Park System, State Natural Areas Volunteer Program, Monitoring, and Safety & Education. Through the Bureau of Natural Heritage Conservation, citizens can help care for Wisconsin’s public lands and native landscapes. Citizens can also help scientists monitor Wisconsin's plants, animals, water, weather, and soils, or become a volunteer instructor to help and influence other resource users.

Wisconsin Department of Veterans Affairs Recreation:
Veterans are eligible for special benefits from the WDNR to honor their service. These may include reduced fees, resident fees for active duty service members, and eligibility for certain hunts.

Department secretaries

Secretaries (1967–present)

See also
 C.D. "Buzz" Besadny Anadromous Fish Facility
 List of law enforcement agencies in Wisconsin
 List of State Fish and Wildlife Management Agencies in the U.S.

References

External links
Wisconsin Department of Natural Resources

Natural Resources
State law enforcement agencies of Wisconsin
State environmental protection agencies of the United States
Natural resources agencies in the United States
1967 establishments in Wisconsin